Pityotrichus barbatus is a species of typical bark beetle in the family Curculionidae. It is found in North America.

References

Further reading

 
 

Scolytinae
Articles created by Qbugbot
Beetles described in 1928